The Blood of the Ancestors is a 1920 German silent film directed by Karl Gerhardt and starring Robert Scholz, Harald Paulsen, and Lil Dagover. It was shot at the Babelsberg Studios of Decla-Bioscop in Berlin. The film's art direction was by Hermann Warm.

Cast

References

Bibliography
 Jacobsen, Wolfgang. Babelsberg: das Filmstudio. Argon, 1994.

External links

1920 films
Films of the Weimar Republic
Films directed by Karl Gerhardt
German silent feature films
Films produced by Erich Pommer
German black-and-white films
Films shot at Babelsberg Studios